The Little Breadwinner is a 1916 British silent drama film directed by Wilfred Noy and starring Kitty Atfield and Maureen O'Hara.

References

Bibliography
 Denis Gifford. The Illustrated Who's Who in British Films. B.T. Batsford, 1978.

External links

1916 films
Films directed by Wilfred Noy
British silent feature films
British black-and-white films
1916 drama films
British drama films
1910s English-language films
1910s British films
Silent drama films